Roy Morris Blake Sr. (March 29, 1928 – March 4, 2017) was a Texas politician and businessman from Nacogdoches, Texas. He served in the Texas House of Representatives from the 4th District. He also served in the Texas Senate from the 3rd district, and was president pro tempore of the Texas Senate in the Seventieth Texas Legislature.

Personal life
Roy Morris Blake was born on March 29, 1928, in Nacogdoches, Texas, to Lynn T. and Pattie Lee Hall Blake, he was the youngest of 6 children. In 1945, he graduated from Nacogdoches High School, and then attended Texas A&M University for 1 year before enrolling in the US Navy to fight in World War II. After returning to Nacogdoches he began to attend Stephen F. Austin State University where he graduated in 1950. On June 28, 1949, he married Mae Deanne Goodwin, they had 5 children together. One of their children is Republican Representative Roy Blake Jr. Blake was a member of First United Methodist Church Nacogdoches. Mae Deanne Blake died on April 24, 2012.

Blake died on March 4, 2017, at his home in Nacogdoches, Texas, at the age 88; he was under hospice care. His funeral was held at First United Methodist Church Nacogdoches, and was officiated by Dr. Jeff McDonald. Blake is buried at Sunset Memorial Park in Nacogdoches, Texas.

Career

Political
Blake began his political career by being elected to the Nacogdoches City Commission in 1965, he served 6 years or 3 terms on the commission. Blake was sworn in to represent Texas House of Representatives, District 4 on January 9, 1973. Blake was a strong proponent of local governments throughout his career, and earned recognition from Texas Municipal League. Blake was elected to Texas Senate, District 3 and was sworn in on Feb 28, 1978. While in the senate he was on several committees such as the Senate Administration Committee. Blake was president pro tempore of the Texas Senate during the Seventieth Texas Legislature. Blake was a Democrat.

Business
Blake founded the Roy Blake Insurance in 1963.

References

1928 births
2017 deaths
Stephen F. Austin State University alumni
Members of the Texas House of Representatives
Texas state senators